Tinguá Biological Reserve is a biological reserve in the Serra do Tinguá mountains, Rio de Janeiro state, eastern Brazil.

Location

It is administered by the Chico Mendes Institute for Biodiversity Conservation.
The reserve lies in the municipalities of Duque de Caxias, Nova Iguaçu and Petrópolis in Rio de Janeiro State.
It adjoins the  Jaceruba Environmental Protection Area, created in 2002, to the west.
The biome is Atlantic Forest and includes submontane, montane and upper montane rain forest.
The reserve is in the Central Rio de Janeiro Atlantic Forest Mosaic, created in 2006.

Conservation

The Biological Reserve is a "strict nature reserve" under IUCN protected area category Ia.
The purpose is to fully protect the biota and other natural attributes without direct human interference.
Protected species in the reserve include southern muriqui (brachyteles arachnoides), red myotis (myotis ruber), Recife broad-nosed bat (platyrrhinus recifinus), ocelot (leopardus pardalis mitis), cougar (puma concolor capricornensis), the frog species thoropa petropolitana and thoropa lutzi, Chaco eagle (Harpyhaliaetus coronatus), 
grey-winged cotinga (tijuca condita), Salvadori's antwren (myrmotherula minor), white-necked hawk (leucopternis lacernulatus) and white-eared parakeet (pyrrhura leucotis).

References

Sources

Biological reserves of Brazil
Protected areas of the Atlantic Forest
Protected areas of Rio de Janeiro (state)
Duque de Caxias, Rio de Janeiro
Petrópolis
Protected areas established in 1989
1989 establishments in Brazil